Located in Salem, Massachusetts and owned by the Peabody Essex Museum the Cotting–Smith Assembly House was built in 1782 and is located at 138 Federal Street in the Federal Street District.  Built as a Federalist Clubhouse in which balls, concerts, lectures, and other events might be held. George Washington attended a dance here. The original architect is unknown, but the house was later remodeled by Samuel McIntire for use as a private residence. The house is in the Federal style and is listed in the National Register of Historic Places. The building can be rented for special events.

See also
List of the oldest buildings in Massachusetts
List of historic houses in Massachusetts

External links
 http://www.pem.org

Houses completed in 1782
Houses in Salem, Massachusetts
Peabody Essex Museum
National Register of Historic Places in Salem, Massachusetts
Historic district contributing properties in Massachusetts
Houses on the National Register of Historic Places in Essex County, Massachusetts
1782 establishments in Massachusetts